Mount Nomad is a  mountain summit located in Peter Lougheed Provincial Park in the Canadian Rockies of Alberta, Canada.

History
In 1991, The Grand Fleet Expedition recommended that the mountain be named after  in order to commemorate the seventy-fifth anniversary of the Battle of Jutland. The mountain's name was officially adopted in 1995.

References

Two-thousanders of Alberta
Canadian Rockies
Alberta's Rockies